Wild Onion is the second studio album by American rock band Twin Peaks. It was released on August 5, 2014 in North America by Grand Jury and later in the rest of the world by Communion.

Reception 
Wild Onion received positive reviews. The A.V. Club notes that the album "doubles both its length and offerings, while considerably upgrading the songwriting and production values." Rolling Stone praises the album, while comparing the band to some of their biggest influences: The Rolling Stones and The Velvet Underground. "The spunky quartet pull off Exile-era Stones strut and Velvet Underground guitar poesy with sophistication that's beyond their years, and a sense of humor, too." Consequence of Sound says, "Rather than a barrier, the band's youthfulness might be their biggest weapon... listening to Wild Onion just makes you hungry to see what else they have in store."

Track listing

Personnel 
Twin Peaks

 Connor Brodner – drums
Jack Dolan – lead vocals , bass guitar
Clay Frankel – lead vocals , guitar
Cadien Lake James – lead vocals , guitar

Production

 Doug Boehm – mixer
 Colin Croom – producer, recording
 R. Andrew Humphrey – producer, recording 
 Pete Lyman – mastering

References

2014 albums
Twin Peaks (band) albums